'Peninsula Catholic High School is a college preparatory regional school of the Diocese of Richmond located in Newport News, Virginia, which offers grades 8 through 12.

It is a member of the National Catholic Educational Association (NCEA) and is accredited byAdvancED.

History
Peninsula Catholic High School was founded in 1903 as St. Vincent de Paul School for girls by the Sisters of Charity of Nazareth with the help of Mr. and Mrs. Thomas Fortune Ryan, who donated significant funds and the original school building in downtown Newport News; it became co-educational in 1929 when the Xaverian Brothers closed their school for boys.  It was renamed Peninsula Catholic High school in 1966 by Bishop Russell, in the belief that the name should reflect all supporting parishes.  The school opened a new facility in the fall of 1995 on Harpersville Road. In 2015 a $2.1 million athletic complex was completed. Since the 1984–85 school year, Peninsula Catholic has been under lay administration.

Demographics

65% of Peninsula Catholic students are Catholic. There is a 30% minority enrollment.

Alma mater
The Peninsula Catholic Alma Mater is set to the tune "Annie Lisle" (sometimes called Amici) a popular 1857 Ballad by H. S. Thompson. The tune is one of the most popular "alma mater tunes" and has been adopted by many Schools, Colleges and Universities as settings for their alma maters, including The College of William and Mary, University of North Carolina at Chapel Hill, and Cornell University.The Lyrics of the Alma Mater''':
Hail to thee our Alma Mater, 
Praise for blue and white, 
Ever loyal to Peninsula Catholic,
Onward in the Fight.

Faith and Courage is our motto,
Ever it shall be,
We, the Students of Peninsula Catholic,
Strive for Victory.

Faith in Jesus, spread by spirit,
Bringing light through deed.
Strength through valor, truth and honor,
Serving those in need.

Weekend programs
The Newport News Japanese School (NNJS; ニューポートニュース補習授業校 Nyūpōto Nyūsu Hoshū Jugyō Kō''), a weekend Japanese school, holds its classes at Peninsula Catholic.

Notable alumni
 John Patrick "Pat" Giguere  (Date of birth: May 3, 1950 – October 25, 1983, Class of 1968), namesake of the John P. Giguere Marine Light Attack Helicopter Squadron of the Year and posthumously awarded the silver star for "conspicuous gallantry and intrepidity in action" while serving as an Attack Helicopter Commander of the AH-1T (TOW) Cobra Attack Helicopter in Marine Medium Helicopter Squadron TWO HUNDRED SIXTY-ONE (HMM-261), Twenty-Second Marine Amphibious Unit during combat operations on the Island of Grenada in support of Operation URGENT FURY, on 25 October 1983.
 Robert Banks (born December 10, 1963, attended during 1980s) is a former NFL defensive end. First player in Virginia state history to earn Associated Press All-State honors on both sides of the ball for two consecutive seasons. 
 Jack Morrissey (Class of 1985), Hollywood producer and host of the Smodcast podcast with movie-maker Kevin Smith.
 Vince Sherman (Class of 1986), Vice President, Regulatory Affairs Moody's Shared Services, Inc.
 Billy Fallon (Class of 1990), owner of Billy Bread, Richmond, VA, and co-establisher of Richmond's 2013 Restaurant of the Year, Aziza's.
 David E. Yancey (born April 6, 1972, Class of 1990) elected to the Virginia House of Delegates in 2011. He currently represents the 94th district in Newport News.
 Bobby McKenna (Class of 2006), designer and illustrator of the Vine app for Twitter.

External links
Peninsula Catholic High School - Official website.
- Faculty
- Contact Information

Notes and references

Catholic secondary schools in Virginia
Educational institutions established in 1903
High schools in Newport News, Virginia
Roman Catholic Diocese of Richmond
1903 establishments in Virginia